The Uly Balkan, also known as the Great Balkan Range  is a mountain range in Turkmenistan.

References

Mountain ranges of Asia
Mountains of Turkmenistan